Jigardan Gadhavi (born 29 June 1991), also known as Jigrra, is an Indian playback singer, songwriter, performer, and music composer from Ahmedabad, India. He made his debut in Gujarati cinema with the film Hardik Abhinandan. He is best known for his works in the Gujarati cinema for the songs "Vhalam Aavo Ne" from the film Love Ni Bhavai, "Mane Kahi De" from the film Karsandas Pay & Use, "Chaand Ne Kaho" from the film Chaal Jeevi Laiye! and some of his single songs like Dhimo Varsad, Mogal Taro Aashro, and Mogal Aave. He has also composed music for the films Hardik Abhinandan, I Wish, and Lapet.

Career 
Jigrra received his bachelor's degree in Physiotherapy from the JG College of Physiotherapy in Ahmedabad. He began composing songs in primary school.

Songs

References

External links 
 
 

1991 births
Living people
21st-century Indian singers
21st-century Indian male singers
Indian male singer-songwriters
Indian singer-songwriters
People from Gujarat
Singers from Ahmedabad

Charan
Gadhavi (surname)